Croatian Swimming Federation is the national sports federation tasked with the development, promotion and international representation of swimming in Croatia. It is a member of the Croatian Olympic Committee.

As of 2016, the Federation's President is Ivan Varvodić.

Medalists at Olympic Games

Medalists at World Championships

References

External links

Croatia
1909 establishments in Croatia
Swimming organizations
Swimming in Croatia
Swimming
Sports organizations established in 1909